Smarr is a surname. Notable people with the surname include:

 Larry Smarr (born 1948), American physicist
 Murders of Nicholas Smarr and Jody Smith

See also
 Smarr, Georgia, unincorporated locality in Georgia, United States